The Mandobo River is a river in Western New Guinea.

The Mandobo language is spoken in the Mandobo River watershed.

See also
List of rivers of Western New Guinea
Mandobo language

References

Rivers of Papua (province)